Preanesthetic assessment (also called Preanesthesia evaluation, Pre-anesthesia checkup (PAC) or simply Preanesthesia) is a medical check-up and laboratory investigations done by an anesthesia provider or a registered nurse before an operation, to assess the patient's physical condition and any other medical problems or diseases the patient might have. The goal of the assessment is to identify factors that significantly increase the risk of complications, and modify the procedure appropriately. The aim is to identify the appropriate anesthetic techniques to be used, to ensure the safety of perioperative care, optimal resource use, improved outcomes, and patient satisfaction, while considering the individual and person related risk factors and circumstances. The preanesthetic assessment involves the consideration of information from various sources that include the past medical records, interview, physical examination, as well as results from medical and laboratory tests.

General recommendations have been published in the USA and in India.

A mnemonic has been suggested for pre-anesthetic assessment, to ensure that all aspects are covered. It runs alphabetically:

A - Affirmative history; Airway
B - Blood hemoglobin, blood loss estimation, and blood availability; Breathing
C - Clinical examination; Co-morbidities
D - Drugs being used by the patient; Details of previous anesthesia and surgeries
E - Evaluate investigations; End point to take up the case for surgery
F - Fluid status; Fasting
G - Give physical status; Get consent

References

Surgery
Medical mnemonics